Navin Michael S Param (born 21 October 1995) is a player for the Singapore national cricket team.

In July 2019, he was named in Singapore's Twenty20 International (T20I) squad for the Regional Finals of the 2018–19 ICC T20 World Cup Asia Qualifier tournament. In September 2019, he was named in Singapore's squad for the 2019 Malaysia Cricket World Cup Challenge League A tournament. He made his List A debut for Singapore, against Denmark, in the 2019 Malaysia Cricket World Cup Challenge League A tournament on 19 September 2019.

Later in September 2019, he was named in Singapore's Twenty20 International (T20I) squad for the 2019–20 Singapore Tri-Nation Series. He made his T20I debut for Singapore, against Nepal, in the Singapore Tri-Nation Series on 28 September 2019. In October 2019, he was named in Singapore's squad for the 2019 ICC T20 World Cup Qualifier tournament in the United Arab Emirates. He was the leading run-scorer for Singapore in the tournament, with 158 runs in six matches.

References

1995 births
Living people
Singaporean sportsmen
Singaporean cricketers
Singapore Twenty20 International cricketers
Place of birth missing (living people)
Southeast Asian Games gold medalists for Singapore
Southeast Asian Games silver medalists for Singapore
Southeast Asian Games medalists in cricket
Competitors at the 2017 Southeast Asian Games